Great Western Railway was a British railway company operating from 1833 to 1947.

Great Western Railway or Great Western Railroad may also refer to the following:

Rail companies and routes

Australia
Great Western Railway, Queensland, Australia
Great Western Railway (Tasmania), Australia

Canada
Great Western Railway (Ontario) 
Great Western Railway (Saskatchewan)

United Kingdom
Great Western Railway (train operating company), from 1996
Great Western Main Line, main line railway in England, from London Paddington to Bristol Temple Meads

United States
Atlantic and Great Western Railroad (1853–1880)
Chicago Great Western Railway (1885–1968)
Great Western Railway of Colorado
Great Western Railroad (Illinois) (1853–65)
Great Western Railway of Iowa
Great Western Railroad (Ohio)
New Orleans, Opelousas and Great Western Railroad (1854–1869), became part of the Southern Pacific Company

Elsewhere
Argentine Great Western Railway, Argentina
Great Western Railway of Brazil 
Midland Great Western Railway, Ireland

Other uses
Rain, Steam and Speed – The Great Western Railway, a painting by J.M.W. Turner

See also